The men's cross country mountain biking cycling event at the 2021 Southeast Asian Games took place on 16 May 2022, at the Hoa Binh Gymnastics and Sports Center in Hòa Bình. 18 riders from 7 different nations competed in the event.

Results

References

2021 Southeast Asian Games events
2021
Southeast Asian Games